
Year 316 (CCCXVI) was a leap year starting on Sunday (link will display the full calendar) of the Julian calendar. At the time, it was known as the Year of the Consulship of Sabinus and Rufinus (or, less frequently, year 1069 Ab urbe condita). The denomination 316 for this year has been used since the early medieval period, when the Anno Domini calendar era became the prevalent method in Europe for naming years.

Events 
 By place 

 Roman Empire 
 Emperor Constantine the Great issues an edict, prohibiting the punishment of slaves by crucifixion and facial branding.
 Constantine I sends his half-brother Julius Constantius to Licinius at Sirmium (Pannonia), with the proposal to accept Bassianus as Caesar and give him power over Italy. Licinius refuses, and forces a conspiracy against Constantine. 
 Licinius elevates Valerius Valens to Augustus, and mobilises an army against Constantine. Bassianus is accused of conspiracy and executed. 
 October 8 – Battle of Cibalae: Constantine the Great defeats his rival Licinius near the town of Colonia Aurelia Cibalae (modern-day Vinkovci, Croatia). Licinius is forced to flee to Sirmium and loses all of the Balkans except for Thrace. Peace negotiations are initiated between the two Augusti, but they are unsuccessful.
 December – Battle of Mardia: Constantine I defeats his rival Licinius and senior officer Valerius Valens, near the town of Harmanli (Bulgaria).

 Asia 
 The Xiongnu sack Chang'an, capital of the Chinese Western Jin Dynasty. Emperor Jin Mindi surrenders to Liu Yao. 
 The Western Jin Dynasty ends, and Ancient China is divided.

 By topic 

 Religion 
 At the request of the Roman Catholic Church, Constantine I attempts to end the schism with the Donatist church.

Births 
 Constantine II, Roman emperor (d. 340)
 Martin of Tours, bishop of Tours (d. 397)

Deaths 
 Diocletian, Roman emperor, commits suicide (b. 244)
 Blaise, bishop of Sebastea (martyred)
 Bassianus, Roman advisor and politician
 Suo Chen (or Juxiu), Chinese general
 Tuoba Pugen, Chinese chieftain of the Tuoba clan
 Tuoba Yilu, Chinese chieftain of the Tuoba clan

References